Orbis Publishing Ltd. was a United Kingdom-based publisher of books  and partworks.

Company history
Orbis Publishing Limited was founded in 1970. The company was originally registered on 25 November 1969 under the name Reefdell Limited with the company director and secretary named as Stanley Harold Davis, of 3-5 Leonard Street, City Road, London E.C.2. and the office manager named as David Ordish of the same address. On 1 June 1970 the name of the company was changed to Orbis Publishing Limited and the company secretary was at that date named as S. D. Davis.

Orbis employed many writers, researchers, academics, designers, artists and photographers to create the contents for the issues in their various partworks series, including John Gooders, a prolific writer of books on birdlife, who was a consultant editor to Orbis's partwork series The Encyclopaedia of Birds, his work there being so successful as "to merit and entension, requiring Gooders to write a further 12,000 words a week for each of the 26 additional issues".

Partworks publishing was a highly competitive market and for the launch of its partwork series, World of Wildlife in 1971, Orbis Publishing spent "£110,000 for television commercials and another £12,000 for full-page advertisements in the nationals - all crammed into a single message-laden week".

Orbis Publishing was merged into De Agostini UK Ltd in 1999 after being acquired by the Italian De Agostini group.

Partworks
 Scandal
 Natural Choice
 One to One
 The Home Computer Course
 The Home Computer Advanced Course
 PC Genius
 NAM (The Vietnam Experience 1965-75)
 Unsolved
 The Illustrated Encyclopedia of Aircraft
 War in Peace
 War Machine
 The Elite: Against All Odds
 The Blues Collection
 The Unexplained
 The British Empire
 Play it Today
 All About Science
 Greenfingers
 KnowHow
 The Movie: The Illustrated History of the Cinema, published  (in 158 chapters)
 World of Automobiles
 On Four Wheels (in 165 parts)
 On Two Wheels  (in 121 parts)
 The Encyclopedia of Super Cars
 The Illustrated Encyclopedia of Wildlife (in 62 parts)
 Warplane (in 120 parts)
 The History of Rock
 World War II
 The Classic Collection
 Dinosaurs! (An Orbis Play and Learn Collection)
 Bugs (An Orbis Play and Learn Collection)

Albums 
Some magazine partworks were published accompanied with compilation albums.
 The History of Rock (40 volume compilation of vinyl records or audio cassettes) 1981-1987
 The Blues Collection (CD) 1993-1997

References

External links
De Agostini UK website.

Publishing companies of the United Kingdom
Publishing companies established in 1970